Criminal orders is the collective name given to a series of orders, directives and decrees given before and during the invasion of the Soviet Union in World War II by the Wehrmacht High Command. The criminal orders went beyond established codes of conduct and led to widespread atrocities on the Eastern Front.

The orders
Barbarossa Decree, issued 13 May 1941 
Guidelines for the Conduct of the Troops in Russia, issued 19 May 1941 
Commissar Order, issued 6 June 1941 
 Orders Concerning the Deployment of the Security Police and the Security Service within Military Formations, issued 28 April 1941
 Orders relating to the treatment of prisoners of war, issued June to December 1941

See also 

 Commando Order
 Severity Order
 War crimes of the Wehrmacht
 Myth of the clean Wehrmacht

References

Bibliography
 
 
 

Military history of Germany during World War II
Military history of the Soviet Union during World War II
Eastern Front (World War II)
Orders by Adolf Hitler
Germany–Soviet Union relations
Nazi war crimes
War crimes of the Wehrmacht
1941 documents
Nazi war crimes in Russia